Spyridon Kladouchas (born 11 October 1980) is a Greek boxer. He competed in the men's heavyweight event at the 2004 Summer Olympics. Kladouchas has also won the bronze medal in 2003 European Union Amateur Boxing Championships which took place in Strasbourg. In 1998, 2002 and 2003 he won the gold medal in the Greek National Championship.

References

External links
 

1980 births
Living people
Greek male boxers
Olympic boxers of Greece
Boxers at the 2004 Summer Olympics
Sportspeople from Athens
Heavyweight boxers
21st-century Greek people